Nadir is both a surname and a given name that is a variation of Nader.

In the Arabic language, it is a boy's name meaning "dear", "scarce" or "precious." (Arabic writing: نادر)

Notable people with the name include:

Persons

Given name
 Nadir Afonso (born 1920), Portuguese painter
 Nadir Belhadj (born 1982), footballer
 Nadir Çiftçi (born 1992), Turkish footballer
 Nadir Godrej (born 1951), Indian industrialist
 Nadir Kouidri (born 1975), professionally known as Ridan, French singer

Middle name
 Mehmet Nadir Ünal (born 1993), Turkish kickboxer and amateur boxer
 Mohammed Nadir Shah (1883–1933), King of Afghanistan from 1929 to 1933

Surname
 Asil Nadir (born 1941), Turkish Cypriot businessman
 Kerime Nadir (1917–1984), Turkish writer
 Moyshe Nadir (1885–1943), American writer and satirist

Fictional character
 Zain Nadir, a The Bill character
 Abed Nadir, a Community character
 Nadir Khan, Known as "The Persian" in the Gaston Leroux novel The Phantom of the Opera, given this name in the 1990 adaptation by Susan Kay, Phantom.

See also 
 Nadira
 Nadir
 Nader

References

Arabic-language surnames
Arabic masculine given names